Sir Stanley Charles Burbury,  (3 December 1909 – 24 April 1995) was an Australian jurist. He was the Chief Justice of the Supreme Court of Tasmania, and the first Australian-born person appointed as Governor of Tasmania, serving from 1973 to 1982.

Biography
Stanley Burbury was born on 3 December 1909 in Perth, Western Australia. He had a distinguished career in law in Tasmania, culminating in becoming Chief Justice of the Supreme Court of Tasmania.

Burbury was appointed Governor of Tasmania in 1973, the first Australian to hold the office. He was also National President of the Winston Churchill Memorial Trust.

Burbury died on 24 April 1995 at Hobart, Tasmania.

Honours
Burbury was created a Knight Commander of the Order of the British Empire (KBE) in the 1958 New Years Honours.

On 20 April 1977, during the 1977 Royal Visit, Queen Elizabeth II made Burbury a Knight Commander of the Royal Victorian Order (KCVO).

On 28 August 1981 Burbury was made a Knight Commander of the Order of St Michael and St George (KCMG).

Legacy
The impoundment that was created by Hydro Tasmania on the King River on the West Coast of Tasmania, is called Lake Burbury.

The University of Tasmania has a lecture theatre named after Stanley Burbury.

Burbury Close, a street in Barton in the Australian Capital Territory is named after Stanley Burbury.

References

1909 births
1995 deaths
Governors of Tasmania
Chief Justices of Tasmania
Australian Knights Commander of the Order of the British Empire
Australian Knights Commander of the Order of St Michael and St George
Australian Knights Commander of the Royal Victorian Order
Judges of the Supreme Court of Tasmania
20th-century Australian judges
Australian King's Counsel
Australian barristers
University of Tasmania alumni